Tereza Kožárová (born 18 October 1991) is a Czech football striker, currently playing for Slavia Prague. She has been a member of the Czech national team since 2010.

Honours 
 Titles 
 Czech First Division (8): 2007–08, 2009–10, 2010–11, 2011–12, 2012–13, 2014–15, 2015–16, 2016–17
 Czech Women's Cup (7): 2007–08, 2008–09, 2009–10, 2010–11, 2011–12, 2012–13, 2015–16

 Best result in other competitions
 UEFA Champions League (Quarterfinals): 2015–16, 2017–18

External links 
 

1991 births
Living people
Czech women's footballers
Czech Republic women's international footballers
Women's association football forwards
FC Slovan Liberec players
SK Slavia Praha (women) players
AC Sparta Praha (women) players
Czech Women's First League players